Kokoona sabahana is a species of plant in the family Celastraceae. It is a tree endemic to Borneo where it is confined to Sabah. It is threatened by habitat loss.

References

sabahana
Endemic flora of Borneo
Trees of Borneo
Flora of Sabah
Vulnerable plants
Taxonomy articles created by Polbot
Plants described in 1994